Yulia Raskina (born April 9, 1982 in Minsk, Belarus) is a Belarusian former rhythmic gymnast and trainer. She is the 2000 Olympics silver medalist, the 1999 World All-around silver medalist, the two time (2000,1999) European All-around silver medalist and 1999 Grand Prix Final All-around champion.

Personal life 
Raskina is Jewish. She was born into a sporting family. Her mother was the master of sports of the international class of the USSR in artistic gymnastics. Her father was also a master of sports, a trainer in track and field athletics.

Career 
Raskina broke into the International RG scene at the 1997 World Championships in Berlin and was a three-time national champion. She became the 1999 World Championships all-around silver medalist and was a two-time European all-around silver medalist in 1999 and 2000. Raskina won the gold medal in ball at 2000 European in Zaragosa. She marked her career high by winning the silver in all-around at the 2000 Summer Olympics held in Sydney, Australia ahead of then Olympic gold favorite Alina Kabayeva who took the bronze medal.  She lost the gold to Yulia Barsakova by 0.084.   Had her hoop not gone out of bounds by an inch which was a mandatory 0.1 deduction and a 4.9 out of 5.0 in Artistry, she would have won the gold. Raskina made unsuccessful comeback until 2003 and finally completed her career.

In 2005 and 2006, Raskina took part in Cirque du Soleil's Corteo alongside former Ukrainian rhythmic gymnast Tamara Yerofeeva. She won Belarusian TV project "Star Dances" with professional dancer Denis Moryasin and was selected to represent Belarus at the Eurovision Dance Contest.

She is currently working as a coach for German national team in rhythmic gymnastics, contributing to the rising success of German rhythmic gymnasts in 2022.

Notable trainees include:

Darja Varfolomeev - twice 2022 European bronze medalist.
Margarita Kolosov

Routine music information

Detailed Olympic results

See also
 List of select Jewish gymnasts

References

External links
 
 
 

1982 births
Living people
Belarusian rhythmic gymnasts
Jewish gymnasts
Olympic gymnasts of Belarus
Olympic silver medalists for Belarus
Gymnasts at the 2000 Summer Olympics
Olympic medalists in gymnastics
21st-century Belarusian Jews
Medalists at the 2000 Summer Olympics
Medalists at the Rhythmic Gymnastics World Championships
Gymnasts from Minsk